Pathrail Mosque, also known as Majlis Aulia Mosque, is an Islamic place of worship located in the Bhanga Upazila of Bangladesh's Faridpur District. It is 4 km south from Polia which is 8 km east by the Bhanga-Mawa highway from 'Bhanga Square' associated with Faridpur-Barishal highway from Faridpur District.

History
The Pathrail Mosque was built during the reign of the Sultan of Bengal, Ghiyasuddin Azam Shah, between 1393 and 1410 (or 1493–1519). It is currently known as 'Majlis Aulia Mosque', and shortly 'Awlia Mosque'. The mosque is adjacent to the mazar of the medieval Muslim preacher Majlis Abdullah Khan.

Construction
Architectural design of Pathrail Mosque is similar to the Choto Sona Mosque and Bagha Mosque of Rajshahi and identified the Shahi dynasty by the Department of Archaeology, Bangladesh.

Historical Pathrail Mosque is rectangular shaped. There are ten domes with same height arranged over the roof supporting by the inside vim. The roof is lightly curved like nail. Five outlet doorways are in the east and two each in the north and west side. Four pillars are in the corner to strengthen the wall and same quantity pillars are separately stand inside of the structure and divided the floor in two aisles. Each wall is 2 m wide and occupies 21.79 m x 8.60 m area.  Height is max 6.5 m. There are five Mihrabs faced towards the eastern doorways at the opposite side. All the doorways arches look like vault and middle one is bigger showing rectangular projection. Wall of the mosque is ornamented by rectangular terracotta. Varieties of decorative designs are floral scrolls, rosettes, cusped arch motifs, diaper including hanging patterns.

Ancient time, people of this area suffered for drinking water. Pathrail Dighi a big tank dug in the same period for the locality besides the mosque on 32.15 acre land to solve scarce of water and for worship facilities. Graves of famous Majlish Abdullah Khan and Fakir Solimuddin in the south of the mosque.

See also
 List of archaeological sites in Bangladesh

References

External links

Mosques in Bangladesh
15th-century architecture
Bengal Sultanate mosques